Eljon Toçi (born 9 January 2003) is an Albanian professional footballer who plays as a centre-forward for  club Fiorentina.

Club career

Early career
Toçi started his career with local club Olimpia Merano in South Tyrol as a young child, before joining Südtirol, also in the same region. He would progress through the ranks at the club and was promoted to the first team in January 2020, where he made his senior professional debut in a Serie C match on 19 January 2020, coming on as an 85th minute substitute in the 4–1 win over Rimini F.C. 1912.

References 

2003 births
Living people
People from Dibër (municipality)
Albanian footballers
Albania youth international footballers
Albania under-21 international footballers
Albanian expatriate footballers
Expatriate footballers in Italy
Albanian expatriate sportspeople in Italy
Association football forwards
Serie C players
F.C. Südtirol players
Serie A players
ACF Fiorentina players